Habib Rahman (1915 – 1995) was an Indian architect who worked on the Delhi Zoological Park, Gandhi Ghat, and Rabindra Bhavan in New Delhi.

Biography
Habib Rahman obtained his Bachelor of Engineering in 1939 in Calcutta. He studied at the MIT and obtained his Masters in Architecture in 1944 (the first Indian to complete this program). From 1944 to 1946, he worked at the architecture firms of Lawrence B. Anderson, William Wurster Walter Gropius, and Ely Jacques Kahn in Boston.

Habib Rahman returned to Calcutta during the 1946 Calcutta riots and became the Senior Architect of the government of West Bengal from 1947 to 1953. Starting in 1953, Habib Rahman became the Senior Architect of the Central Public Works Department in New Delhi (and became Chief Architect in 1970).

From 1974 to 1977, he was Secretary of the Delhi Urban Arts. In 1977, his contract was discontinued after he opposed several projects including building a second Connaught Place in New Delhi.

Work

During the 1950s and 1960s, the Nehru government invited architects, among which Habib Rahman, to develop new public buildings built in the spirit of the independence of India. He designed the Gandhi Ghat in 1949 in Barrackpore, the New Secretariat in Kolkata (completed in 1954), the Dak Bhawan in 1954, the Rabindra Bhavan in 1961 (or 1963), the World Health Organization in Delhi in 1962 (demolished in July 2019), the Sardar Patel Bhawan in 1973 (opposite to the Dak Bhawan). He also designed the National Zoological Park that opened in 1959 (which included historical ruins, and housed over a thousand animal species).

He also built the memorials of Abul Kalam Azad, Zakir Husain and Fakhruddin Ali Ahmed.

Habib Rahman's architecture mirrored the modernist ethos of the newly Independent India.

Bibliography
S M Akhtar, Habib Rahman, The Architect of Independent India, 2016

Awards
1955: Padma Shri
1974: Padma Bhushan
1995: JK Cement Architect of the Year Chairman's Award for Life Achievement

Personal life
In 1945 he married Indrani Rahman, Miss India 1952 and an Odissi dancer. The couple had two children, Ram Rahman and Sukanya Rahman.

References

External links 
 

20th-century Indian architects
Recipients of the Padma Bhushan in science & engineering
1915 births
1995 deaths
Engineers from West Bengal